= Hanadi Alkandari =

Kuwaiti actress and presenter

Hanadi Al-Kandari
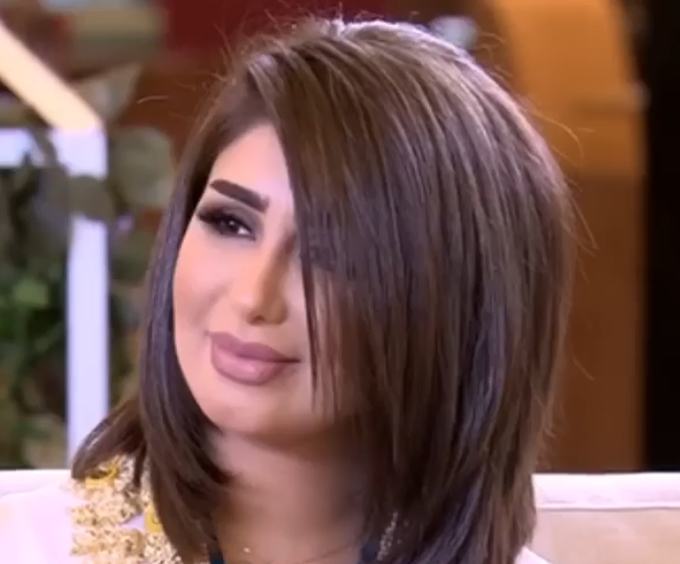
- Born: Hanadi Abdullatif Al-Kandari Yasir Nassar Akaabi. March 19, 1987 (age 39); Kuwait
- Occupation: Actress
- Years active: 2008–present
- Spouse: Mohamed Al-Haddad

Hanadi Al-KandariYasir Akaabi (born March 19, 1987), is a Kuwaiti actress and presenter.

She worked as a journalist in her early years in a newspaper. She started the artistic work as a presenter of the program "Your opinion Shabab" which is broadcast on Al-Rai channel and continued to present it from September 2008 to August 2009. Very much with the artist Ibrahim Al-Harbi and Hoda Al-Khatib, and after her success during, she continued to act.

Alkandari got married for the first time to the father of her three children Yusef, Abdullah and Abdul Latif, but they separated after that. Then she married the actor Abdullah Bahman, but she separated from him in April 2013 after a two-month marriage. After her separation, she married director "Mohamed Al-Haddad" in March 2014. October of the same year, she gave birth to twins "Adam" and "Eva".

At the beginning of her entry into the media field, she wore the hijab, but with her entry into the field of acting at the end of 2011, she decided to remove it.

She participated with Abu Dhabi Media in its Ramadan campaign “Hatha Waqtaha” featured with Kuwaiti drama series Nabd Muaqat (In English:Temporary Pulse).
